Toski is a surname. Notable people with the surname include: 

Bob Toski (born 1926), American golfer 
Faton Toski (born 1987), Kosovar football player

See also
Toskić